Tibba Talwara is an archaeological site in Lodhran District, Punjab, Pakistan, about  east of Lodhran.

Archaeological sites in Punjab, Pakistan
Former populated places in Pakistan
Culture of Punjab, Pakistan
Lodhran District